Phoxinus semotilus is a species of freshwater fish in the family Cyprinidae. It is endemic to the Korean peninsula.

References

Phoxinus
Taxa named by David Starr Jordan
Taxa named by Edwin Chapin Starks
Fish described in 1905